Collinsville is a town in Grayson County, Texas, United States. Its population was 1,624 at the 2010 census, up from 1,235 at the 2000 census. It is part of the Sherman–Denison metropolitan statistical area. Collinsville is located on U.S. Route 377 south of Whitesboro.

History

In 1904, Collinsville Academy was built. The school had two stories and six rooms, and could accommodate about 400 students. The school was rebuilt in 1941 with the intention being to help the citizens of Collinsville retain jobs during the Depression, according to the older citizens of the community. A 20-room school was built to replace it, and continues to be used as an elementary school. A high school and junior high were built in 1995.

Geography

Collinsville is located in southwestern Grayson County at  (33.560731, –96.911027). US 377 passes through the west side of the town, leading north  to Whitesboro and south  to Pilot Point.

Demographics

2020 census

As of the 2020 United States census, there were 1,866 people, 661 households, and 479 families residing in the town.

2000 census
As of the census of 2000, 1,235 people, 469 households, and 346 families were residing in the town. The population density was 1,720.6 people/sq mi (662.3/km2). The 507 housing units averaged 706.3/sq mi (271.9/km2). The racial makeup of the town was 93.60% White, 0.32% African American, 0.40% Native American, 4.37% from other races, and 1.30% from two or more races. Hispanics or Latinos of any race were 5.59% of the population.

Of the 469 households, 36.5% have children under the age of 18 living with them, 59.9% were married couples living together, 10.2% had a female householder with no husband present, and 26.2% were not families. About 23.9% of all households were made up of individuals, and 13.9% had someone living alone who is 65 or older. The average household size was 2.57, and the average family size was 3.03.

In the town, the age distribution was 26.8% under  18, 7.4% from 18 to 24, 27.7% from 25 to 44, 20.5% from 45 to 64, and 17.6% who were 65  or older. The median age was 37 years. For every 100 females, there were 93.6 males. For every 100 females age 18 and over, there were 87.6 males.

The median income for a household in the town was $32,833, and for a family was $41,000. Males had a median income of $27,763 versus $22,232 for females. The per capita income for the town was $15,123. About 8.1% of families and 10.2% of the population were below the poverty line, including 13.9% of those under age 18 and 10.4% of those age 65 or over.

Education
The town is served by the Collinsville Independent School District and is home to the Collinsville High School Pirates.

Notable people
 Bill Denton, gymnast who won silver at the 1932 Olympics
 William H. "Alfalfa Bill" Murray, ninth governor of Oklahoma

References

External links
 City of Collinsville official website
 Collinsville Chamber of Commerce

Towns in Grayson County, Texas
Towns in Texas